Peter Guttridge (born in Burnley, Lancashire) is an English novelist and critic.

Life
He was educated at Burnley Grammar School, the University of Oxford and the University of Nottingham. He is a former Director of the Brighton Literature Festival and remains a regular chairperson at major UK book festivals.  In 2014 he established Books By The Beach, the Scarborough Book Festival, which runs each April, and remained director until 2018.
A freelance journalist for twenty years, specialising in literature and film, he has interviewed numerous writers from around the world and many high-profile actors and film directors.
He has also written about astanga vinyasa yoga.  He was the Observer newspaper’s crime fiction critic 1999-2011.

Between 1996 and 2005 he wrote an award-winning series of satirical crime novels featuring a yoga-obsessed  journalist,  Nick Madrid, and his tough-as-nails sidekick, Bridget Frost.
His latest publications are the non-comic Brighton crime trilogy:  The City of Dreadful Night, The Last King of Brighton and The Thing Itself (formerly God's Lonely Man).  The Trilogy and later Brighton books are published in French by Le Rouergue. The other Brighton novels so far in what is now the Brighton series are:The Devil's Moon (2013);Those Who Feel Nothing (2014 - and in its French edition in 2016); Swimming With The Dead (2019); The Lady of The Lake (2019); Butcher's Wood (2021). He has written an e-thriller, Paradise Island. An e-novella, The Belgian and The Beekeeper, is set on the Sussex Downs in 1916, where Sherlock Holmes is asked by a celebrated foreign detective to investigate Dr Watson.

Bibliography

Novels

   (reprint Speck Press, 2004)
 A Ghost of A Chance (1998)
 Two To Tango (1998)
 The Once and Future Con (1999)
 Foiled Again (2001)
 Cast Adrift (2004)
 City of Dreadful Night (2010)
 The Last King of Brighton (2011)
  The Thing Itself (2012)
 The Belgian and The Beekeeper (novella, e-book original, 2012) The Devil's Moon (2013)
 Those Who Feel Nothing (2014)
 Paradise Island (e-thriller original, 2014)Swimming With The Dead (2019)The Lady of the Lake (2019)
' 'Butcher's Wood' ' (2021)

Short Stories

 Don’t Think of Tigers [Editor] (2001)
 The Great Detective; (The Mammoth Book of Comic Crime, 2002)
 The Postman Only Rings When He Can Be Bothered (The Mammoth Book of Comic Crime, 2002; Crime Scenes, 2008)
 The Library Sign (The Illustrated Brighton Moment, 2008)
 The Man With The Pram (Criminal Tendencies, 2009)
 God's Lonely Man  ('The Mammoth Book of Best British Crime", 2014 - this story the winner of the 2013 Graham Greene International Festival Short Story Competition)
 The Box-Shaped Mystery (Winner Margery Allingham Short Story Competition 2016)
 Normal Rules Do Not Apply (Ten Year Stretch 2018)

Non-Fiction

 The Great Train Robbery (2008)

References

Sources
 Barry Forshaw: British Crime Writing: An Encyclopedia (Greenwood World Publishing)

External links 
 Official site 
 Deckchair Interview 

British crime writers
People from Burnley
People educated at Burnley Grammar School
Year of birth missing (living people)
Alumni of the University of Oxford
Alumni of the University of Nottingham
Living people